Piatykhatky Raion was a raion (district) of Dnipropetrovsk Oblast, southeastern-central Ukraine. Its administrative centre was located at the city of Piatykhatky. The raion was abolished on 18 July 2020 as part of the administrative reform of Ukraine, which reduced the number of raions of Dnipropetrovsk Oblast to seven. The area of Piatykhatky Raion was merged into Kamianske Raion.

At the time of disestablishment, the raion consisted of four hromadas:
 Lykhivka settlement hromada with the administration in the urban-type settlement of Lykhivka;
 Piatykhatky urban hromada with the administration in Piatykhatky;
 Saksahan rural hromada with the administration in the selo of Saksahan;
 Vyshneve settlement hromada with the administration in the urban-type settlement of Vyshneve.

References

Former raions of Dnipropetrovsk Oblast
1923 establishments in Ukraine
Ukrainian raions abolished during the 2020 administrative reform